Strabena isoalensis is a butterfly in the family Nymphalidae. It is found in western Madagascar.

References

Strabena
Butterflies described in 1951
Endemic fauna of Madagascar
Butterflies of Africa